The Kauaʻi ʻamakihi (Chlorodrepanis stejnegeri) is a species of Hawaiian honeycreepers endemic to Kauaʻi in the family Fringillidae. The species Hawaiian name is associated with is Kihikihi, or kihi, which stems from the word amakihi. Kihikihi, meaning curved, makes a reference to the bill of the Kauaʻi ʻamakihi.  The Kauaʻi ʻamakihi has similar physical features to an extinct species, the Kauaʻi nukupuʻu . When flying or feeding, the Kaua’i ‘amakihi lets out a distinguishing tweet.

Distribution 
This species is endemic to the island of Kauaʻi  The Kaua‘i ‘amakihi resides in the higher elevations of the Kaua‘i mountains usually above 600 meters in elevation. They previously occurred at lower elevations, but due to the loss of habitat, are now mostly found at elevations higher than 600 meters in mountainous areas. They are known to be around ‘ōhi‘a and koa trees. They are especially common in ōhi'a trees where they often nest and in ōhi'a forests. They can be spotted at Waimea Canyon, Nā Pali Plateau, Alaka‘i Swamp, and Makaleha Mountains.

Anatomy 
This species has a greenish-yellow with black lores and a large, sickle-shaped, down curved beak. Males usually have bigger beaks and more color compared to the females which have smaller beaks  and a more dull color. More dull feathers and a bigger beaks distinguishes the Kaua‘i ‘amakihi from the other ʻamakihi species.

Conservation 
The Kauaʻi ʻamakihi has been categorized as vulnerable by Bird Life International. While their population numbers have been steady, like other honeycreepers, the Kauaʻi ʻamakihi is threatened by habitat loss, invasive species, and avian malaria, but has not been affected as strongly as other species in the subfamily.

References

External links 

 Species factsheet - BirdLife International
 Videos, photos and sounds - Internet Bird Collectio

Hawaiian honeycreepers
Chlorodrepanis
Biota of Kauai
Endemic birds of Hawaii
Birds described in 1989
Taxa named by Scott Barchard Wilson
Taxonomy articles created by Polbot